Taubert is a German surname. Notable people with the surname include:

 Albert Taubert (1900–1964), United States Marine
 Agnes Taubert (1844–1877), German writer and philosopher
 Eberhard Taubert (1907–1976), German propagandist
 Emil Taubert (1844–1895), German philologist and writer, and younger brother of Wilhelm Taubert
 Ernst Eduard Taubert  (1838–1934), Pomeranian composer and music critic
 Frank Taubert (born 1956), German diver
 Baron Jean-Léonard Taubert de Massy (1974), Monaco Royal House
 Jean-Léonard Taubert-Natta (1947–2020), Monegasque noble
 Paul Hermann Wilhelm Taubert (1862–1897), German botanist
 Steven Taubert (born 1953), Australian footballer
 Wilhelm Taubert (1811–1891), also known as Carl Gottfried Wilhelm Taubert; German composer

German-language surnames